Shinova is a Spanish alternative rock group, formed in 2008 in Berriz, Vizcaya (Basque Country). The band's music were initially close to hard rock and alternative metal, they were often compared to Spanish compatriots Sôber, Savia and Skizoo. However, since 2014's Ana y el Artista Temerario released via Spanish label Maldito Records, the music has become more indie rock-oriented. Their fourth album Volver was released in 2016 via Warner Music and peaked at no. 49 in Spanish Albums Charts.

Current members 
 Gabriel de la Rosa – vocals
 Daniel del Valle – guitars
 Erlantz Prieto – guitars
 Ander Cabello – bass
 Joshua Froufe – drums

Past members 
 Eneko Urcelay – drums (2008–2014)
 Iñaki Elorza –  guitars (2008–2010)
 Javier Martín – guitars (2008–2011)
 Xabier Laria – guitars (2011–2014)
 Argi – guitars (2012–2013)
 Christian Rodriguez – keyboards (2011–2014)
 David Gorospe – studio drummer in the recording of Ana y el Artista Temerario.

Discography 
 Latidos (DFX) – 2009
 La Ceremonia de la Confusión (Independent) – 2011
 Ana y el Artista Temerario (Maldito Records) – 2014
 Volver (Warner Music Spain) – 2016
 Cartas De Navegación (Warner Music Spain) – 2018
 La Buena Suerte (Warner Music Spain) – 2021

References

External links 
 Official website

Spanish indie rock groups
Spanish alternative rock groups
Spanish pop rock music groups
Spanish hard rock musical groups
Spanish alternative metal musical groups
Rock en Español music groups